Dominik Meffert (born 9 April 1981) is a German professional tennis player. He qualified for the 2007 US Open, his only Grand Slam singles competition, but lost in the first round. He recorded a first round victory over 2003 French Open Champion Juan Carlos Ferrero at the 2010 Gerry Weber Open.

Titles

Singles (5)

Doubles (8)

External links
 Official website

1981 births
Living people
People from Mayen
German male tennis players
Sportspeople from Rhineland-Palatinate
21st-century German people